There are several lists of solar eclipses.

On Earth, by the Moon

By location
 List of solar eclipses visible from Australia
 List of solar eclipses visible from China
 List of solar eclipses visible from the Philippines
 List of solar eclipses visible from Russia
 List of solar eclipses visible from Ukraine
 List of solar eclipses visible from the United Kingdom
 List of solar eclipses visible from the United States

By time period of history
 List of solar eclipses in antiquity (20th century BCE to 4th century CE/AD)
 List of solar eclipses in the Middle Ages (5th to 15th century)
 Modern history
 List of solar eclipses in the 16th century
 List of solar eclipses in the 17th century
 List of solar eclipses in the 18th century
 List of solar eclipses in the 19th century
 List of solar eclipses in the 20th century
 List of solar eclipses in the 21st century
 Solar eclipses after the modern era (22nd to 30th century)

On the Moon, by the Earth

Other
 Solar eclipses in fiction

References 
 Five Millennium Catalog of Solar Eclipses: -1999 to +3000 (2000 BCE to 3000 CE)
 Ascii: Title: Five Millennium Catalog of Solar Eclipses: -1999 to +3000 (2000 BCE to 3000 CE)